The 2004 UCI Track Cycling World Cup Classics is a multi race tournament over a season of track cycling. The season ran from 17 February 2004 to 16 May 2004. The World Cup is organised by the UCI.

Results

Men

Women

References
Round 1, Moscow – Men's Results
Round 1, Moscow – Women's Results
Round 2, Aguascalientes Results
Round 3, Manchester Results
Round 4, Sydney Results

World Cup Classics
UCI Track Cycling World Cup